Aubrey Richards (6 June 1920 – 29 May 2000) was a Welsh actor who appeared in numerous film and television productions over a 40-year period, often portraying professors.

He began his acting career in repertory theatre. His films included The Ipcress File (1965), It! (1967), The Man Who Haunted Himself (1970), Under Milk Wood, Endless Night and Savage Messiah (all 1972). On television he had a major role as Samuel Evans in Carrie's War (1974), and recurring roles in How Green Was My Valley (1975–76), as Mr. Elias, and in Emergency-Ward 10. He also featured as Professor Parry in the Doctor Who adventure The Tomb of the Cybermen (1967).

Richards was married to the distinguished stage manager Diana Boddington and they had two children.

Filmography

References

External links

1920 births
2000 deaths
Welsh male film actors
Welsh male television actors
Male actors from Swansea
20th-century Welsh male actors